Kostas Christoforakis (born 11 April 1975) is a Greek football manager. He is the current manager of Super League 2 club Kerkyra.

References

1975 births
Living people
Greek football managers
PAE Kerkyra managers
People from Laconia
Footballers from the Peloponnese